The Assistant Secretary of Defense for Legislative Affairs, or ASD(LA), is the head of the Office of the Secretary of Defense for Legislative Affairs, responsible for providing support to the Secretary of Defense (SecDef) in his/her dealings with the United States Congress. In addition to serving as SecDef's legislative adviser, the ASD(LA) promotes the Department of Defense's strategy, legislative priorities, policies, and budget before Congress. In carrying out these responsibilities, the ASD(LA) directs a team of managers, action officers, and support personnel who help direct, monitor and manage communications and activities between Congress and elements of the Department of Defense. The ASD(LA) is considered a part of the Office of the Secretary of Defense.

History

This office was established as Special Assistant (Legal, Legislative, and Public Affairs) upon the creation of the National Military Establishment in 1947 (the NME was renamed the Department of Defense in 1949). This was one of three special assistants to the first Secretary of Defense.

The post was retitled Assistant Secretary of Defense (Legal and Legislative Affairs) in August 1949 based on amendments to the National Security Act (P.L. 81-216) that authorized three Assistant Secretaries of Defense.

The position was abolished in 1953, with its functions divided and transferred to the General Counsel and the Assistant Secretary of Defense (Legislative and Public Affairs), new posts established as the result of DoD Reorganization Plan No. 6 (June 1953) and Defense Directive 5122.1 (September 1953).

This position was abolished again in 1957, with its functions divided and transferred to Assistant Secretary of Defense (Public Affairs) and Assistant to the Secretary of Defense (Legislative Affairs), new posts established by Defense Directive 5105.13 (August 1957).

Since 1957, the responsibilities of this position have stayed mostly constant, but the title has changed between Assistant Secretary of Defense and Assistant to the Secretary of Defense five times, largely because the Secretary of Defense has historically been authorized a limited number of assistant secretaries.  The position was given statutory standing as the Assistant Secretary of Defense (Legislative Affairs) by the National Defense Authorization Act for FY1994 (P.L. 103-160), passed November 30, 1993.

Office holders

The table below includes both the various titles of this post over time, as well as all the holders of those offices.

Budget

Budget totals
The annual budget for the ASD(LA) is contained in the OSD's budget, under the Defense-Wide Operation and Maintenance (O&M) account. The Obama administration cut funding for this position by over 37% in FY12.

Notes

References